Homecoming is an American psychological thriller television series based on the Gimlet Media podcast of the same name. Created by Eli Horowitz and Micah Bloomberg, the series premiered November 2, 2018, on Amazon Prime Video. Horowitz and Bloomberg also serve as writers and executive producers alongside Sam Esmail, Chad Hamilton, Julia Roberts, Alex Blumberg, Matt Lieber, and Chris Giliberti. Esmail also directed every episode of the first season, which stars Roberts, Bobby Cannavale, Stephan James, Shea Whigham, Alex Karpovsky, and Sissy Spacek.

The series was given an initial series order for two seasons. The second season deviates from the podcast and features a new story and characters. The second season was directed by Kyle Patrick Alvarez and stars Janelle Monáe, Chris Cooper and Joan Cusack with Stephan James and Hong Chau returning from the first season. The second season premiered on May 22, 2020.

Premise
Heidi Bergman had been a social worker at the Homecoming Transitional Support Center, a live-in facility run by the Geist Group; the facility ostensibly helped soldiers transition to civilian life. Four years later, Bergman has started a new life working as a waitress but has difficulty remembering her time at Homecoming. After a U.S. Department of Defense auditor inquires as to why she left Homecoming, Bergman comes to realize that she had been misled about the true purpose of the facility.

Cast and characters

Main
 Julia Roberts as Heidi Bergman (season 1), Walter's caseworker who is employed at a secret government facility, the Homecoming Transitional Support Center.
 Bobby Cannavale as Colin Belfast (season 1; guest season 2), Heidi's supervisor.
 Stephan James as Walter Cruz, a young military veteran and client of the Homecoming facility who is eager to rejoin civilian life.
 Shea Whigham as Thomas Carrasco (season 1), a bureaucrat from the Department of Defense investigating the Homecoming Transitional Support Center.
 Alex Karpovsky as Craig (season 1; recurring season 2), an employee at the Homecoming facility.
 Sissy Spacek as Ellen Bergman (season 1), Heidi's mother.
 Janelle Monáe as Jacqueline Calico / Alex Eastern (season 2), a woman who wakes up on a rowboat and goes on the search for her identity.
 Hong Chau as Audrey Temple (season 2; recurring season 1), an assistant at Geist Emergent Group, Homecoming's parent company.
 Chris Cooper as Leonard Geist (season 2), the owner of Geist Emergent Group.
 Joan Cusack as Francine Bunda (season 2), a representative from the Department of Defense who becomes a partner at Geist after the Homecoming incident.

Recurring
 Ayden Mayeri as Reina, the receptionist at the Homecoming Facility. (season 1)
 Bill Stevenson as Abe (season 1)
 Sam Marra as Javen (season 1)
 Marianne Jean-Baptiste as Gloria Morisseau, Walter's mother. (season 1)
 Jeremy Allen White as Shrier, a former soldier from the same unit as Walter and now a fellow client at the Homecoming facility. (season 1)
 Alden Ray as Maurice (season 1)
 Henri Esteve as Abel (season 1)
 Frankie Shaw as Dara (season 1)
 Gwen Van Dam as Mrs. Trotter (season 1)
 Brooke Bloom as Pam, Carrasco's boss at the Department of Defense.
 Sydney Poitier Heartsong as Lydia Belfast, Colin's wife. (season 1)
 Dermot Mulroney as Anthony, Heidi's boyfriend (season 1)
 Marcus Henderson as Engel (season 1)
 Jason Rogel as Cory (season 1)
 Rafi Gavron as Rainey (season 1)
 Jacob Pitts as AJ, who is exploring several new business ventures. (season 1)
 Lewie Bartone as New Guy (season 1)
 Kristof Konrad as Mr. Heidl (season 1)
 Fran Kranz as Ron, Colin's boss at Geist Emergent Group.
 Tyler Ritter as Lane (season 2)
 Mary Holland as Wendy (season 2)
 Jimmy Bellinger as Chad (season 2)
 Christopher Redman as Kyle (season 2)
 Johnny Sneed as Dr. Zamani (season 2)
 Audrey Wasilewski as Officer Donna (season 2)

Guests
 Caitlin Leahy as Kate ("Helping")
 Michael Hyatt as Evita ("Toys")
 Philip Anthony-Rodriguez as Ramon ("Protocol")
 John Billingsley as Buddy ("People")

Episodes

Season 1 (2018)

Season 2 (2020)

Production

Development
On December 16, 2016, it was announced that Universal Cable Productions had won the rights to Gimlet Media's podcast Homecoming for producer Sam Esmail to develop as a television series. The first season was executive produced by Esmail through his company Esmail Corp, along with podcast creators Eli Horowitz and Micah Bloomberg, podcast producer Alicia Van Couvering, Gimlet co-founders Alex Blumberg and Matt Lieber, and Gimlet Pictures founder Chris Giliberti, with production companies Esmail Corp, Anonymous Content, and Gimlet Media. Universal reportedly managed to outbid other interested parties including Sony Pictures Television for Michelle MacLaren, 20th Century Fox Television for Matt Reeves and Michael De Luca, and TriStar Pictures for George Clooney and his Smoke House Pictures banner as a feature film.

On July 19, 2017, it was announced that Amazon Video had given the production a two-season straight-to-series order. It was also reported that Horowitz and Bloomberg would write the series and that Esmail would direct it. On July 20, 2018, it was announced that the series would premiere on November 2, 2018. On April 8, 2020, it was announced that the second season would premiere on May 22, 2020. Esmail and Roberts returned as executive producers the second season, though Esmail did not direct any episodes and Roberts did not reprise her role.

Casting
On June 5, 2017, it was announced that Julia Roberts was in talks for the series' female lead. On November 8, 2017, it was announced that Stephan James was cast in the series' male lead. Later that month, Bobby Cannavale joined the cast. On January 17, 2018, it was reported that Shea Whigham had been cast as a series regular. In March 2018, it was announced that Alex Karpovsky had joined the main cast, that Dermot Mulroney, Hong Chau, Jeremy Allen White, Sydney Poitier, Marianne Jean-Baptiste, Brooke Bloom, Ayden Mayeri, Jacob Pitts, and Sissy Spacek had been cast in recurring roles, and that Fran Kranz would appear as a guest star. On January 16, 2019, it was reported that Roberts would not reprise her role of Heidi Bergman in the second season of the series but would continue to serve as an executive producer.

On July 23, 2019, it was announced that Janelle Monáe would star in the second season. In August 2019, it was confirmed that Stephan James and Hong Chau would return for the second season. Chris Cooper was cast the following month. In December 2019, it was announced Joan Cusack and Mary Holland had joined the cast of the series in recurring roles.

Filming
Filming was slated to begin in Los Angeles in April 2018. Principal photography actually began in February 2018 at the Universal Studios backlot in Los Angeles where the production became the first project to shoot in Universal's newly constructed production facilities. Exteriors of the Homecoming facility, as well as interiors of the facility lobby and Geist headquarters, were filmed at the former corporate headquarters of Toyota in Torrance, California.

Release

Marketing
On June 29, 2018, a series of "first look" images from the series were released. On July 20, 2018, the first teaser trailer for the series debuted at San Diego Comic-Con and was subsequently released online. A promotional poster for the series was also released. On September 8, 2018, the second teaser trailer was released. On September 13, 2018, the first official trailer for the series was released. On October 22, 2018, the second official trailer for the series was released.

Premiere
On September 7, 2018, the series held its world premiere during the 2018 Toronto International Film Festival at the Ryerson Theatre in Toronto, Ontario, Canada. The first four episodes of the series were screened as part of the festival's Primetime series of television screenings. On October 25, 2018, the series held its American premiere at the Regency Bruin Theatre in Westwood, Los Angeles, California. A screening of the first four episodes of the series took place during the event and those in attendance included Sam Esmail, Jennifer Salke, Julia Roberts, Stephan James, Dermot Mulroney, and Shea Whigham.

Reception

On Rotten Tomatoes it received an overall score of 79%, and an overall score of 75 on Metacritic.

Season 1
The first season gained critical acclaim. On the review aggregation website Rotten Tomatoes, the first season holds a 98% approval rating with an average rating of 8.3 out of 10 based on 99 reviews. The website's critical consensus reads, "An impressive small-screen debut for Julia Roberts, Homecoming balances its haunting mystery with a frenetic sensibility that grips and doesn't let go." Metacritic, which uses a weighted average, assigned the first season a score of 83 out of 100 based on 35 critics, indicating "universal acclaim."

Season 2
The second season received mixed to positive reviews from critics. On Rotten Tomatoes, the second season holds a 60% approval rating with an average rating of 6.7 out of 10 based on 48 reviews. The website's critical consensus reads, "As stylish, well-acted, and compelling as it can be, Homecomings second season simply can't find its way out of the shadow of its first." Metacritic, which uses a weighted average, assigned the second season a score of 61 out of 100 based on 21 critics, indicating "generally favorable reviews."

Awards and nominations

See also
 List of podcast adaptations

References

External links
 
 

2010s American drama television series
2018 American television series debuts
2020s American drama television series
2020 American television series endings
English-language television shows
Amazon Prime Video original programming
LGBT-related television shows
American LGBT-related television episodes
Nonlinear narrative television series
Television series by Anonymous Content
Television series by Universal Content Productions
Television series by Amazon Studios
Television shows set in Tampa, Florida
Television shows based on podcasts
Television series set in 2018
Fiction set in 2022